Roin Kerdzevadze (born 26 September 1970 – February 2010) was a Georgian football midfielder.

References

1970 births
2010 deaths
Footballers from Georgia (country)
FC Dinamo Tbilisi players
FC Margveti Zestafoni players
Omonia Aradippou players
Kapaz PFK players
Association football midfielders
Cypriot First Division players
Azerbaijan Premier League players
Expatriate footballers from Georgia (country)
Expatriate footballers in Cyprus
Expatriate sportspeople from Georgia (country) in Cyprus
Expatriate footballers in Azerbaijan
Expatriate sportspeople from Georgia (country) in Azerbaijan